The Pineios (referred to in Latin sources as Peneus) is a river in Thessaly, Greece. The river is named after the god Peneus. During the later Middle Ages, it was also known as the Salamvrias or Salavrias (Σαλα[μ]βριάς).

It flows from the Pindus mountains through the Thessalian plain and empties into the Aegean Sea, northeast of the Vale of Tempe, near Stomio. It creates a large delta, well known for its beauty and for many animal species, protected by international environmental treaties. Its total length is 205 km. Its source is near the village Malakasi, on the eastern slope of the Pindus main range, east of Metsovo. The Meteora region and the city of Larissa lie along the Pineios. Trikala lies on its tributary, the Lithaios. In the 1960s, a freeway connecting Athens and Thessaloniki was constructed in much of the Vale of Tempe.

Three ships of the Hellenic Navy have been named after the river.

Tributaries
Pineios major tributaries are: Malakassiótiko réma (stream), Mourgkánis (stream), Portaikós, Lithaíos, Pámissos, Enipeas and Titarisios.

Places along the river
The Pineios flows along the following places, from the source downstream: Malakasi, Kalampaka, Megarchi, Megala Kalyvia, Farkadona, Larissa, Evangelismos, Omolio.

References

External links

 Ovide, Métamorphoses, Livre I
Pinios River

 
Rivers of Thessaly
Landforms of Larissa (regional unit)
Landforms of Trikala (regional unit)
Rivers of Greece